Ephraim Blakeslee was a member of the Wisconsin State Assembly.

Biography
Blakeslee was born on May 12, 1838, in Fenner, New York. During the American Civil War, he served with the 12th Wisconsin Volunteer Infantry Regiment of the Union Army, achieving the rank of captain. He died in February 1911.

Carte de Visite of Ephraim Blakeslee 
This Carte de Visite shows Ephraim Blakeslee , who was born in Fenner, New York, on May 12, 1838, and as a young child moved with his family to Wisconsin, where they settled near Ironton in Sauk County. He grew up tall and strong on the family farm, standing an imposing 6 feet tall with brown hair and brown eyes. At the age of 23, he married Mary Ballard and six months later, in September 1861, volunteered to serve in the Union Army.

He joined Company B, 12th Wisconsin Infantry Regiment as a 1st Sergeant and served in that capacity until accepting a commission as 2nd Lieutenant of Company H in May 1862. He was promoted to 1st Lieutenant of the company in January 1864 and in August, he was detached to command Company E. A member of that company, Hosea Rood, later wrote about Blakeslee, "We liked him very much- I think all our men who marched to the sea would vote with both hands that Eph. Blakeslee was not only a most excellent company commander, but a royal good fellow, besides." As alluded to by Rood, Blakeslee took part in the Atlanta campaign, the March to the Sea, and the Carolina campaign with the 12th Wisconsin. In April 1865, he received a promotion to Captain of Company H, and was mustered out with his men in July.

Returning to Sauk County, Blakeslee sold the family farm and moved into Ironton, where he engaged in the mercantile trade. He and his wife Mary had three children before she died in 1871. He married Caroline Swift two years later. Blakeslee died on February 22, 1911, and is buried at Resting Green Cemetery in Ironton.

Assembly career
Blakeslee was a member of the Assembly during the 1880 and 1881 session. He was a Republican.

CPT Ephraim Blakeslee 

 BIRTH
 12 May 1838 New York, USA
 DEATH
 Feb 1911 (aged 72) Ironton, Sauk County, Wisconsin, USA
 BURIAL
 Resting Green Cemetery Ironton, Sauk County, Wisconsin, USA
 PLOT
 Row 1/2
 MEMORIAL ID
 66197149

References

People from Madison County, New York
People from Sauk County, Wisconsin
Republican Party members of the Wisconsin State Assembly
People of Wisconsin in the American Civil War
Union Army officers
1838 births
1911 deaths
Burials in Wisconsin
19th-century American politicians